Jonathan Pierre-Etienne (born July 7, 1984) is a Canadian lawyer and former professional Canadian football linebacker and defensive lineman for the Toronto Argonauts of the Canadian Football League. He was originally drafted by the BC Lions in the fifth round of the 2009 CFL Draft. After completing his college eligibility, he signed with the Argonauts on December 16, 2011. He played college football for the Rutgers Scarlet Knights from 2005-2008 and then transferred to the Université de Montréal and played CIS football for the Montreal Carabins from 2008-2011. He was released by the Argonauts on June 17, 2012.

References

External links
Toronto Argonauts bio

1984 births
Living people
Canadian football people from Montreal
Players of Canadian football from Quebec
Canadian football defensive linemen
Montreal Carabins football players
BC Lions players
Toronto Argonauts players